Lucas Conceição Vilar (born 10 March 2001) is a Brazilian sprinter competing primarily in the 200 metres. He competed in the 200 metres at the 2020 Summer Olympics.

Personal bests
Outdoor
100 metres – 10.34 (São Paulo 2020)
200 metres – 20.57 (Cali 2021)
400 metres – 46.10 (Cuiaba 2022)

References

External links

2001 births
Living people
Brazilian male sprinters
People from Limeira
Athletes (track and field) at the 2020 Summer Olympics
Olympic athletes of Brazil
Athletes (track and field) at the 2018 Summer Youth Olympics
Sportspeople from São Paulo (state)
21st-century Brazilian people